Below is the list of party leaders (former and present) in Turkey. Only the leaders of parties which were present in the parliament or received a considerable percentage of votes are shown.

The list

Key

|
CHP:		
TCF:		
SCF:		
MKP:			
DP:		
CMP:		
CMP:
HURP:         	
CKMP:		
MP2:		                                     			
YTP:			
AP:			
MHP:			
GP:				
CGP:			
DP2:		
TİP:			
CP:			
MNP:			
MSP:			
RP:				
FP:				
SP:				
TBP:				
DSP:			
MDP:			
ANAP:				
HP:				
SODEP:		
DYP:				
İP:
LDP:
VP:
BBP:	
ATP:		
SHP:		
DTRP
DTP:		 
AKP: 			
YTP2:
HYP:
HDP:
YRP:
İYİ:
TİP:
GP:
DEVA:
YP:
TDP: 
MP:
ZP:
|
Republican People's Party
Progressive Republican Party (Turkey)
Liberal Republican Party (Turkey)
National Development Party (Turkey)	
Democrat Party (Turkey, historical)
Nation Party (Turkey, 1948)
Republican Nation Party
Liberty Party (Turkey)	
Republican Peasants' Nation Party
Nation Party (Turkey, 1962)                                     			
New Turkey Party (1961)	
Justice Party (Turkey)	
Nationalist Movement Party	
Reliance Party		
Republican Reliance Party	
Democratic Party (Turkey, 1970)
Workers Party of Turkey	
Republican Party (Turkey)	
National Order Party	
National Salvation Party	
Welfare Party		
Virtue Party		
Felicity Party		
Turkey Unity Party		
Democratic Left Party (Turkey)	
Nationalist Democracy Party (Turkey)	
Motherland Party (Turkey)		
People's Party (Turkey)		
Social Democracy Party (Turkey)
True Path Party		
Workers' Party (Turkey)
Patriotic Party (Turkey)	
Great Unity Party
Liberal Democratic Party (Turkey)		
Bright Turkey Party
Social Democratic Populist Party (Turkey)
Democrat Turkey Party
Democratic Society Party 
Justice and Development Party (Turkey)	
New Turkey Party (2002)
People's Ascent Party
People's Democracy Party (Turkey)
New Welfare Party
Good Party
Workers' Party of Turkey (2017)
Future Party (Turkey)
Democracy and Progress Party
Innovation Party (Turkey)
Movement for Change in Turkey
Homeland Party (Turkey, 2021)
Victory Party

Gallery

See also 
 List of political parties in Turkey

Lists of Turkish politicians
Turkey history-related lists